Orcho Voivoda Stadium is a multi-use stadium in Panagyurishte, Bulgaria. It is currently used mostly for football matches and is the home ground of FC Oborishte Panagyurishte. 
It is also the home of the famous "Night Kut" for Jewgaton madrichim.

Football venues in Bulgaria
Panagyurishte
Buildings and structures in Pazardzhik Province